Naomi Sandra Castle  (born 29 May 1974 in Sydney) is an Australian water polo player from the gold medal squad of the 2000 Summer Olympics. Castle was the captain of the Australian team at the 2004 Summer Olympics where they placed 4th.

In 2009 Castle was inducted into the Queensland Sport Hall of Fame. In 2014, she was inducted into the Water Polo Australia Hall of Fame.

Castle competed in the Gladiator Individual Sports Athletes Challenge in 1995.

See also
 Australia women's Olympic water polo team records and statistics
 List of Olympic champions in women's water polo
 List of Olympic medalists in water polo (women)
 List of World Aquatics Championships medalists in water polo

References

External links
 

1974 births
Living people
Australian female water polo players
Olympic gold medalists for Australia in water polo
Water polo players at the 2000 Summer Olympics
Water polo players at the 2004 Summer Olympics
Sportswomen from New South Wales
Sportswomen from Queensland
Water polo players from Sydney
Medalists at the 2000 Summer Olympics
Recipients of the Medal of the Order of Australia
20th-century Australian women
21st-century Australian women